The Deo Gracias Fresco in the Heiligen Geist Kirche (1326) in Wismar is a fresco that depicts a mathematical-logical puzzle made up of letters. In a hospital church, the riddle can be understood both as a praise to God and as a remedy. The representation of praise as a puzzle and a learning aid for abstract thinking is unusual and therefore valuable. It is so far unique in Germany.

German culture
Fresco paintings